The 1948 Louisiana gubernatorial election was decided by a Democratic primary held in two rounds on January 20 and February 24, 1948, which was tantamount to election. The 1948 election saw the defeat of Louisiana's reformer "anti-Long" faction and the election of Earl Kemp Long to his first full term as governor.

Background
Like most Southern states between the Reconstruction Era and the Civil Rights Movement, Louisiana's Republican Party was virtually nonexistent in terms of electoral support.  This meant that the two Democratic Party primaries held on these dates were the real contest over who would be governor.

Under Louisiana's constitution, incumbent governor Jimmie Davis could not succeed himself in a consecutive term.

Democratic primary

Candidates
Sam H. Jones, former Governor (1940–44)
Robert F. Kennon, judge and former Mayor of Minden
Earl Long, former Governor (1939–40)
Jimmy Morrison, U.S. Representative from Hammond

Campaign
Louisiana's reformist anti-Long faction supported Sam H. Jones, who had been governor from 1940 to 1944. Jones was endorsed by outgoing Governor Davis and high-profile Louisiana politicians, such as Senator John H. Overton and Mayor deLesseps Story Morrison Sr. of New Orleans, who controlled the city's powerful Crescent City Democratic Association. Jones's reform campaign was weakened by reminders of unethical deals and heavy-handed political tactics in his previous term and by the electorate's lack of enthusiasm for reform governors after eight years.

Sam Jones's main opponent was Long, who had been governor in 1939–40 and the inheritor of his brother Huey Long's Longite political faction. Funded by politicians, oil and gas money, and contributions from organized crime in the New Orleans area, Long ran a theatrical and entertaining campaign, making stump speeches that were a mix of political harangue and humorous anecdotes.  His platform called for the elimination of Jones's civil service, the doubling of state spending on programs like pensions, school lunches, charity hospitals and asylums, new trade schools, pay increases for teachers, an increased homestead tax exemption, and bonuses for veterans of World War II.  Through payoffs and promises of support, Long managed to gain the backing of powerful former enemies, State Senator Dudley LeBlanc, former Governor Jimmie Noe, and U.S. Representative F. Edward Hebert.

Robert F. Kennon drew most of his support from North Louisiana and reformers disillusioned with Jones. Jimmy Morrison (no relation to Mayor Morrison) was supported by former New Orleans mayor Robert Maestri and his Old Regular political machine and finished in fourth place.

Results
Jimmy Morrison was able to carry East Baton Rouge and several parishes in vicinity of his home region.   Kennon won Shreveport's Caddo Parish and attracted some support in the rest of northern Louisiana. Support from deLesseps Morrison's machine allowed Jones to win in New Orleans, and respectable support from sections of the rest of the state sent him into the runoff round with Long. But Long's victories in most parishes in both northern and southern parts of the state gave him a commanding lead going into the second round.

Runoff
In the runoff, the Old Regulars threw their support behind Long. With his longtime enemies were supporting Long, Mayor Morrison stepped up his campaigning for Jones and began a feud with Long that would last until Long's death in 1960. 

The runoff election saw Long elected to the governor's office with an overwhelming majority. Of Louisiana's 64 parishes, only East Baton Rouge  and West Feliciana went for Jones. Jones even lost his home base of Calcasieu Parish. He did not seek the governorship again.

Aftermath
Once in office, Earl Long moved to place President Harry S. Truman on the Louisiana ballot in 1948. The Democrats ran an elector slate in the state committed to then South Carolina Governor Strom Thurmond. Had Long not intervened, Truman would not have been on the Louisiana ballot. Thurmond, as the official Democratic nominee, won Louisiana's ten electoral votes.

Sources 
Michael L. Kurtz and Morgan D. Peoples.   Earl K. Long:  The Saga of Uncle Earl and 	Louisiana Politics, 1990.

Louisiana Secretary of State.   Compilation of Primary Election Results of the Democratic Party of the State of Louisiana, 1948.

1948
Louisiana
Gubernatorial
Louisiana gubernatorial election 
Louisiana gubernatorial election